Polaribacter septentrionalilitoris is a species of Gram-negative, non-motile temperate marine bacteria, traits typical of members of the genus Polaribacter. This strain was originally isolated from the biofilm of a stone collected at Nordstrand, which is a tiny peninsula on the German portion of the North Sea. Lab culture tests have found it to be mesophilic in nature. Colonies of this strain are pigmented bright yellow when grown on agar. It also demonstrates robust growth on hypersaline agar. Its type strain is ANORD1T (=DSM 110039T=NCIMB 15081T=MTCC 12685T).

References

External links 

 LPSN lpsn.dsmz.de
 Eprints Universität Kiel

Flavobacteria